City of Joy is a 1992 drama film directed by Roland Joffé, with a screenplay by Mark Medoff. It is based upon the novel of the same name by Dominique Lapierre, which looks at poverty in then-modern India, specifically life in the slums. The film stars Patrick Swayze, Pauline Collins, Om Puri and Shabana Azmi.

Plot

Hazari Pal is a rural farmer who moves to Calcutta with his wife Kamla and three children in search of a better life. The Pals do not get off to a good start: they are cheated out of their rent money and thrown out on the streets, and it's difficult for Hazari to find a job to support them. But the determined family refuses to give up and eventually finds its place in the poverty-stricken city.

Meanwhile, on the other end of Calcutta, Max Lowe, a Houston surgeon distraught after the loss of a young patient, has arrived in search of spiritual enlightenment. However, he encounters misfortune as soon as he arrives. After being tricked by a young prostitute, he is roughed up by thugs and left bleeding in the street without his documents and valuable possessions.

Hazari comes to Max's aid and takes the injured doctor to the "City of Joy," a slum area populated with lepers and poor people which becomes the Pals' new home and the American's home-away-from-home. Max spends a lot of time in the neighborhood, but he does not want to become too involved with the residents because he is afraid of becoming emotionally attached to them. He soon, however, is coaxed into helping his new-found friends by a strong-willed Irish woman, who runs the local clinic.

Eventually, Max begins to fit in with his fellow slum-dwellers and become more optimistic. There are many around him whose lives are much worse, but they look on each day with a hope that gives new strength to the depressed doctor.

Cast

Reception

Box office 
In contrast to some of Joffe's previous successes (The Killing Fields), the film was not a box office success, even on its modest budget; According to the Internet Movie Database and Box Office Mojo, the film grossed $14.7 million in the United States.

Critical response 
On Rotten Tomatoes the film has an approval rating of 53% based on reviews from 17 critics.

Roger Ebert of the Chicago Sun-Times gave it 3 out of 4 and wrote: "City of Joy seems a little too "written," too conformed to the rituals of Hollywood screenplays. There's so much interesting stuff in the movie we are prepared to forgive that."

See also
 1992 in film
 List of drama films

References

External links 
 
 City of Joy at Box Office Mojo

1992 films
1992 drama films
British drama films
English-language French films
Films directed by Roland Joffé
TriStar Pictures films
Warner Bros. films
Films set in India
Films set in Kolkata
Films shot at Pinewood Studios
Films scored by Ennio Morricone
Films based on French novels
Films shot in India
French drama films
1990s English-language films
1990s British films
1990s French films